"Don't Lie to Me" is the lead single from the 2018 Barbra Streisand album Walls. It criticizes the presidency of Donald Trump. A remix by Dave Audé spent twelve weeks on the US Dance Club chart.

Production 

The song was released on the 2018 album Walls, the first featuring primarily new material since 2005. Co-written by the singer, Streisand felt a need to write the song to help her cope with the Trump administration. "Don't Lie To Me" is the album's first single. It was inspired by a road trip when Streisand was listening to the radio and becoming disgusted by the content of the news. She originally wanted to create a subtle song, but ended up writing "Bombastic" lyrics.

Composition 
The song, written by Streisand, John Shanks, Jonas Myrin and Jay Landers, is "grand, lush and heavily orchestrated". Billboard described it as an "impassioned, dramatic ballad with pointed barbs". The piece has a "bombastic string-laden backing".

Reception 
Billboard deemed the song "grand and politically charged".

Charts

References 

2018 songs
Barbra Streisand songs
Songs written by Barbra Streisand
Songs written by John Shanks
Songs written by Jonas Myrin
Songs written by Jay Landers
Anti-fascist music
Songs about Donald Trump
Columbia Records singles